LaMonte Ulmer (born September 17, 1986) is an American professional basketball player who last played for Orléans Loiret Basket of the LNB Pro A. Standing at 6 ft 6 in (1.98 m), Ulmer usually plays as small forward.

Professional career
In the 2014–15 season, Ulmer played for KTP in the Finnish Korisliiga. He averaged 17.8 points and 8.6 rebounds per game for KTP.

For the 2015–16 season, Ulmer signed with s.Oliver Baskets in Würzburg, a German first division team.

On 17 June 2017, Ulmer signed with Champagne Châlons-Reims Basket of the French Pro A.

On July 9, 2019, he has signed with JDA Dijon Basket of the LNB Pro A. He was named to the Basketball Champions League Team of the Week on January 16, 2020, after contributing 15 points and 10 rebounds in a win over P.A.O.K. BC. Ulmer averaged 10 points and 4 rebounds per game. On July 22, he signed with Orléans Loiret Basket. Ulmer averaged 11 points and 3.4 rebounds per game. He re-signed with the team on August 5, 2021.

Career Statistics

|-
| align="left" |  2010–11
| align="left" | AS Soleuvre
| Luxembourg League
| 11 || 38.7 || .568 || .238 || .710 || 15.6 || 2.5 || 1.3 || 1.0 || 26.6
|-
| align="left" |  2011–12
| align="left" | AS Soleuvre
| Luxembourg League
| 22 || 39.1 || .513 || .400 || .768 || 12.5 || 1.2 || 1.6 || 1.3 || 26.2
|-
| align="left" |  2012–13
| align="left" | Tampereen Pyrintö
| Finnish League
| 47 || 28.4 || .541 || .302 || .773 || 7.9 || 1.2 || 1.8 || .8 || 19.1
|-
| align="left" |  2015–16
| align="left" | s.Oliver Würzburg
| Basketball Bundesliga
| 37 || 26.0 || .519 || .441 || .828 || 5.2 || 1.2 || 1.0 || .7 || 12.0
|-
| align="left" |  2019–20
| align="left" | JDA Dijon Basket
| LNB Pro A
| 25 || 23.6 || .479 || .318 || .797 || 4.4 || .9 || .7 || .4 || 10.3
|-
| align="left" |  2020–21
| align="left" | Entente Orléanaise
| LNB Pro A
| 22 || 21.1 || .522 || .466 || .750 || 3.4 || .7 || .9 || .5 || 11.1
|-
|-class=sortbottom
| align="center" colspan=2 | Career
| All Leagues
| 164 || 28.3 || .526 || .377 || .773 || 7.3 || 1.2 || 1.3 || .7 || 16.5

References

1986 births
Living people
American expatriate basketball people in Finland
American expatriate basketball people in France
American expatriate basketball people in Germany
American expatriate basketball people in Luxembourg
American expatriate basketball people in Romania
American men's basketball players
Basketball players from New Haven, Connecticut
Champagne Châlons-Reims Basket players
CSU Pitești players
JDA Dijon Basket players
JL Bourg-en-Bresse players
KTP-Basket players
Maine Red Claws players
Orléans Loiret Basket players
Rhode Island Rams men's basketball players
S.Oliver Würzburg players
Small forwards
Tampereen Pyrintö players